Messenger Records is an independent record label.  Based out of New York City, USA, the label was started by Brandon Kessler during his time in college in 1996.  The label has released albums by Anne McCue, Dan Bern, Chris Whitley, Johnny Society, and others.

The label also offers consulting services to independent artists, including advice on promotion, touring, and music production.

See also
 List of record labels

External links
 Official site.
 Billboard Magazine - Marketing Article
 Columbia College Today - Article.

Record labels established in 1996
American independent record labels
Alternative rock record labels